How Stella Got Her Groove Back is a 1998 American romantic comedy-drama film directed by Kevin Rodney Sullivan, adapted from Terry McMillan's best-selling 1996 novel of the same title. The film stars Angela Bassett, Taye Diggs (in his film debut), Whoopi Goldberg, and Regina King. The original music score was composed by Michel Colombier.

Plot

Stella Payne, a very successful 40-year-old stockbroker, is a single parent raising her 11-year-old son Quincy in Marin County, California. Her friends and family chastise her for being without a relationship for too long. 

Stella sends Quincy to his father's for two weeks and then, seeing an ad for Jamaican vacations, spontaneously calls her best friend from college, Delilah Abraham in New York city to propose a visit. While declining to join her, her friend instead persuades her to take a first-class vacation to Montego Bay, Jamaica. 

As Stella soaks in the beauty of the island on her first morning there, she encounters a handsome young islander at breakfast. Winston Shakespeare is a chef's assistant and twenty years her junior, but very interested in her. He suggests they meet later at the hotel's disco pajama party.

Winston's pursuit of Stella turns into a blossoming romance that is abruptly interrupted when a chef hires him as an assistant, which prevents her from seeing him for the rest of her trip. On her return to California, she discovers that a merger with another company has phased out her job.

Winston convinces Stella to return, which she does with Quincy and his cousin. Delilah gives her a supportive call, then Stella is taken to meet his mother, who shames her as they are the same age. That, along with a call from Delilah's oncologist, forces her to take personal inventory of her life.

Stella flies to New York to be with the dying Delilah. When removing cancer from one part of her body, the surgeon finds a metastasis in her liver. The two friends are able to spend some time together in the hospital room before Delilah dies. Winston comes to New York for the funeral and then flies with Stella and her companions to California.

Upon arriving home Stella's family, and even her ex, welcome Winston. After a short while, tensions rise and they fight. He thinks she's ashamed to be seen with him and he finds her controlling, and she grows annoyed with his immaturity and youthful taste. Winston surprises her by fixing up her carpentry workshop.

Stella's old brokerage calls, trying to lure her back with the offer of a vice-president's position and a $250,000 salary, which she turns down to try to found her own firm. Admidst all her stress, Winston proposes. Stella temporises and dithers over her decision. 

After a week without an answer, Winston announces that he intends to go back to Jamaica and enroll in medical school, and takes a taxi to the airport. Stella intercepts him in the terminal and says yes to his proposal, having realized the need for balance between love and companionship and her responsibilities as a mother and a corporate executive.

Cast
 Angela Bassett as Stella Payne
 Taye Diggs as Winston Shakespeare
 Whoopi Goldberg as Delilah Abraham
 Regina King as Vanessa
 Suzzanne Douglas as Angela
 Michael J. Pagan as Quincy Payne
 Sicily as Chantel
 Richard Lawson as Jack
 Barry Shabaka Henley as Buddy
 Lee Weaver as Nate
 Glynn Turman as Dr. Shakespeare
 Phyllis Yvonne Stickney as Mrs. Shakespeare
 Denise Hunt as Ms. Thang
 James Pickens, Jr. as Walter Payne
 Carl Lumbly as Judge Spencer Boyle
 Victor Garber (uncredited) as Isaac

Reception
Critical reception  was mixed.

On Rotten Tomatoes, the film has an approval rating of 50% based on 50 reviews, with an average rating of 5.5/10. The website's critics consensus reads: "Angela Bassett gracefully breezes through a hot summer fling without much conflict or ado, leaving us wondering when -- or if -- she's ever getting that groove back." On Metacritic, the film has a score of 56 out of 100, based on reviews from 23 critics, indicating "mixed or average reviews". Audiences surveyed by CinemaScore gave the film a grade A−.

Box office
In its opening weekend, Stella grossed $11,318,919, ranking #2 in the domestic box office behind Saving Private Ryans fourth weekend. The film would go on to gross $36,672,941 domestically and an additional $1,605,781 overseas for a worldwide total of $39,278,722, from an estimated $20 million budget.

Soundtrack

A soundtrack containing mostly R&B and reggae was released on August 11, 1998, by MCA Records. It peaked at number eight on the Billboard 200 and number three on the Top R&B/Hip-Hop Albums chart, and was certified gold on September 22, 1998.

Accolades
1999 Acapulco Black Film Festival
 Best Actress – Angela Bassett (won)
 Best Actor – Taye Diggs (nominated)
 Best Actress – Whoopi Goldberg (won)
 Best Director – Kevin Rodney Sullivan (nominated)
 Best Film (won)
 Best Screenplay – Terry McMillan (nominated)
 Best Soundtrack (won)

1999 NAACP Image Awards
 Outstanding Lead Actress in a Motion Picture – Angela Bassett (won)
 Outstanding Motion Picture (won)
 Outstanding Supporting Actress in a Motion Picture – Whoopi Goldberg (won)
 Outstanding Youth Actor/Actress – Michael J. Pagan (won)

See also
 Shirley Valentine

References

External links
 
 
 
 
 

1998 films
1998 comedy-drama films
1998 directorial debut films
1990s buddy comedy-drama films
1990s female buddy films
1998 romantic comedy-drama films
20th Century Fox films
African-American romantic comedy-drama films
American buddy comedy-drama films
American female buddy films
1990s English-language films
Films about vacationing
Films based on American novels
Films based on romance novels
Films directed by Kevin Rodney Sullivan
Films scored by Michel Colombier
Films set in Jamaica
Films set in San Francisco
Films shot in Jamaica
Films shot in Los Angeles County, California
Films shot in San Francisco
Films with screenplays by Ronald Bass
1990s American films